False Flag (original title in ) is an Israeli television thriller drama series. Directed by Oded Ruskin and starring Ishai Golan, the plot involves five ordinary Israelis who wake up one morning and discover that their names, faces, and personal details have been splashed across the world’s media on suspicion of involvement in a high-profile kidnapping.

A remake of the series starring Uma Thurman, called Suspicion, aired on Apple TV in February 2022.

Synopsis
The series revolves around five ordinary Israeli citizens who discover one morning via the media that they are the principal suspects of a high-profile kidnapping and are implicated as culprits in the kidnapping. They are involved in a brutal kidnapping of the Iranian minister of defense, Farhead Sulimani, during his visit to Moscow on 15 April 2015, having arrived in the country earlier that day from London under an alias and using one of several passports. According to the Russian Federal Security Service (FSB), Sulimani was drugged. Widespread speculation, which Russian police allegations support, is that he was killed by the Israeli Mossad in a secret mission.

News channels around the world cover the incident while broadcasting the footage of the kidnapping, the five Israelis soon become wanted and their personal details, including their passports photos, are shown on the media and TV channels around the world.

The unceasing news coverage causes an uproar in the suspects' lives and mixed feelings from their surroundings and the public. Their attempts to deny their involvement are in vain. The Mossad and the Israeli government leave them to deal with it on their own instead of providing protection. It's not long before they undermine their credibility. Later, even their closest friends begin to distrust them. Although eventually it is discovered that they are not that innocent.

Cast and characters

Main cast
 Ishai Golan as Ben "Benny" Rephael – A chemist and a family man, an Israeli with a Greek citizenship. (S1)
 Magi Azarzar as Natalie Alfassia – A bride on her wedding day, an Israeli with a French citizenship. (S1)
 Ania Bukstein as Asia Brindich – A kindergarten teacher, an Israeli with a Russian citizenship. (S1)
 Angel Bonanni as Sean Tilson – An Israeli with dual Dutch citizenship, came back to Israel after a vacation in India. (S1-2)
 Orna Salinger as Emma Lipman – New Israeli citizen with dual British citizenship. (S1)
  as Eithan Kopel – Head of the Shin Bet investigation team and a former Mossad agent. (S1-2)
 Yiftach Klein as Sagi Kedmi (S2)
 Neta Riskin as Anat Kedmi (S2)
 Yousef Sweid as Amir Cohen (S2)
 Hanna Azoulay Hasfari as Miriam Levi (S2)
 Hani Furstenberg as Joan 'Jo' Berger (S2)
 Moran Rosenblatt as Dikla Levi (S2)
 Lihi Kornowski as Mika Arazy (S2)

Recurring cast
 Morris Cohen as Eli Mazor – Shin Bet investigator
 Sergey Bukhman as Alex Feldman – Shin Bet investigator
 Avigail Ariely as Efrat – Ben's wife
 Shmil Ben Ari as Gafni 
 Roi Assaf as Yuval – Natalie's fiance
 Yigal Naor as Gabi

Production
The series is directed by Oded Ruskin and stars Ishai Golan, Maggie Azarzar, Angel Bonanni, Ania Bukstein and Orna Salinger. It was created for Keshet International by Maria Feldman and Amit Cohen.

The storyline is loosely based on the story of the assassination in Dubai of Mahmoud al-Mabhouh, co-founder of the military wing of Islamist Palestinian group Hamas, on January 19, 2010.

Release
The series had its world premiere at the Berlin International Film Festival in February, and won the audience award at France's Series Mania festival in April 2015. In October 2015, during the annual trade show MIPCOM, it was announced that the series was acquired by Fox International and was its first acquisition of a foreign-language series on a global scale.

False Flag originally aired on Israel's Channel 2 on October 29, 2015.

It aired on Fox UK in August 2017, and on Hulu in the United States in January 2018. Both seasons aired on SBS on Demand in Australia from 2020.

Reception
The series was well-reviewed by The Guardian in the UK and by The New York Times US.

Remake

A remake of the series starring Uma Thurman, titled Suspicion, for Apple TV+, aired in February 2022.

Episodes

See also
 Mahmoud al-Mabhouh

References

External links
 
 
 Article on Fox International's website about the acquisition of 'False Flag'

Israeli drama television series
Thriller television series
Espionage television series
Shin Bet in fiction
Channel 2 (Israeli TV channel) original programming
2015 Israeli television series debuts
Television shows set in Moscow
Television shows set in Israel